Nadezhda Strait (Russian: Proliv Nadezhda; Japanese: Rashowa Kaikyo) is a strait that separates the islands of Matua and Rasshua. It is 25.8 km (about 16 mi) wide. The flood tidal current in the strait sets northwest, while the ebb flows to the southeast. These currents create tide rips and may reach over five knots.

It is named after the sloop Nadezhda.

References

Straits of the Kuril Islands